Greif may refer to:

People
 Boris de Greiff Bernal - (1930-2011), Colombian chess master and writer
 León de Greiff Haeusler - (1895–1976), Colombian poet
 Mónica de Greiff Lindo - (born 1956), Colombian lawyer, politician
 Gustavo de Greiff Restrepo - (born 1929), Colombian lawyer, ambassador

See also 
 Greif (disambiguation)